Trouble Every Day is a 2001 French erotic horror film directed by Claire Denis and written by Denis and Jean-Pol Fargeau. It stars Vincent Gallo, Tricia Vessey, Béatrice Dalle, Alex Descas and Marilu Marini. The film's soundtrack is provided by Tindersticks.

Alice Houri, who starred in Denis' previous film Nénette et Boni, has a small cameo as a girl on a metro who watches Shane.

Plot
An American couple, Dr. Shane Brown and his wife June, go to Paris, ostensibly for their honeymoon. In reality, Shane has come to Paris to hunt down neuroscientist Dr. Léo Sémeneau and his wife, Coré, whom Shane once knew and was obsessed with. Despite having had a prolific career, Léo is now working as a general practitioner to keep a low profile. He locks Coré in their house every day, but she occasionally escapes and initiates sex with men before violently murdering them. To protect her, Léo buries the bodies.

Shane begins investigating Sémeneau's whereabouts. A doctor who once worked with Léo eventually gives Shane the couple's address, explaining that Coré is unwell. Meanwhile, two young men who have been casing the Sémeneau home break in, and one of them finds Coré in a boarded-up room. After she seduces him, they begin to have sex, but she violently bites him to death, ripping out his tongue with her teeth. When Shane arrives at the house, he discovers Coré covered in blood. She tries to bite him, but Shane is able to overpower her. As he strangles her, she drops a match, setting the house on fire. Shane leaves her to be consumed by the flames. Just after Shane departs, Léo arrives and witnesses the carnage and the dead Coré.

After Coré's death, Shane becomes strange and distant. While having sex with his wife, he stops and finishes by masturbating, then runs away from her and adopts a puppy. Finally, he goes to a hotel where he brutally rapes a maid and bites her to death, then showers and washes the blood from his body. His wife enters and the couple agree to return home.

Cast
 Vincent Gallo as Shane Brown
 Tricia Vessey as June Brown
 Béatrice Dalle as Coré
 Alex Descas as Léo Semenau 
 Florence Loiret Caille as Christelle
 Nicolas Duvauchelle as Erwan
 Raphaël Neal as Ludo
 José Garcia as Choart
 Hélène Lapiower as Malécot
 Marilu Marini as Friessen
 Aurore Clément as Jeanne

Release
Trouble Every Day was screened out of competition at the 2001 Cannes Film Festival.

Reception
The film received mixed reactions from critics. On Rotten Tomatoes the film has an approval rating of 49% rating, based on 49 reviews. The site's consensus states: "An erotic thriller dulled by a messy narrative." On Metacritic the film has a weighted average score of 40 out of 100 based on reviews from 16 critics, indicating "mixed or average reviews".

Derek Elley of Variety wrote that it is "over-long, under-written and needlessly obscure instead of genuinely atmospheric." Chris Fujiwara of The Boston Globe was more positive, but concludes by calling the film "a success in some sense, but it's hard to like a film so cold and dead."

Later, the film developed a small following who admire it for its themes of existentialism and its unique take on the horror genre as well as gender roles. It was given an in depth analysis by Salon.com which looked at the intricacies of the film, particularly the metaphorical nature of the narrative. At Film Freak Central, Walter Chaw said, "Plaintive and sad, Claire Denis' Trouble Every Day is a rare combination of honesty, beauty, and maybe even genius." The film has been associated with the New French Extremity.

See also
 Vampire films

References

Sources 

 Beugnet, Martine. (2007) Cinema And Sensation: French Film And The Art Of Transgression. Edinburgh: Edinburgh University Press. [see pages 32-47]
 Nancy, Jean-Luc. (2008) ‘Icon Fury: Claire Denis’s “Trouble Every Day”’, Film-Philosophy, 12(1), pp. 1–9. https://doi.org/10.3366/film.2008.0002.
 Scholz, Sebastian. and Surma, Hanna. (2008) ‘Exceeding The Limits Of Representation: Screen And / As Skin In Claire Denis’s “Trouble Every Day” (2001)’, Studies in French Cinema, 8(1), pp. 5–16. https://doi.org/10.1386/sfc.8.1.5_1.
 Taylor, Kate. (2007) ‘Infection, Postcolonialism And Somatechnics In Claire Denis’s Trouble Every Day (2002)’, Studies in French Cinema, 7(1), pp. 19–29. https://doi.org/10.1386/sfci.7.1.19_1.

External links
 
 
 
 
 Salon.com – Analysis of Trouble Every Day

2001 films
2001 horror films
2000s erotic thriller films
French erotic thriller films
French horror thriller films
German erotic thriller films
German horror thriller films
Japanese horror thriller films
Japanese erotic thriller films
2000s French-language films
English-language French films
English-language German films
English-language Japanese films
2000s English-language films
Films directed by Claire Denis
Erotic horror films
Films about sexual repression
Films about cannibalism
New French Extremity films
2001 multilingual films
2000s Japanese films
2000s French films
2000s German films
Films scored by Tindersticks